Keith Norman was general secretary of the Associated Society of Locomotive Engineers and Firemen (ASLEF), the train drivers' trade union in Great Britain, from 2004 to 2011.  He comes from Wales, and is a supporter of the Labour Party.

External links 
Article from BBC website

Year of birth missing (living people)
General secretaries of the Associated Society of Locomotive Engineers and Firemen
Living people
Welsh trade unionists